In mathematics, a prime geodesic on a hyperbolic surface is a primitive closed geodesic, i.e. a geodesic which is a closed curve that traces out its image exactly once. Such geodesics are called prime geodesics because, among other things, they obey an asymptotic distribution law similar to the prime number theorem.

Technical background
We briefly present some facts from hyperbolic geometry which are helpful in understanding prime geodesics.

Hyperbolic isometries
Consider the Poincaré half-plane model H of 2-dimensional hyperbolic geometry. Given a Fuchsian group, that is, a discrete subgroup Γ of PSL(2, R), Γ acts on H via linear fractional transformation. Each element of PSL(2, R) in fact defines an isometry of H, so Γ is a group of isometries of H.

There are then 3 types of transformation: hyperbolic, elliptic, and parabolic. (The loxodromic transformations are not present because we are working with real numbers.) Then an element γ of Γ has 2 distinct real fixed points if and only if γ is hyperbolic. See Classification of isometries and Fixed points of isometries for more details.

Closed geodesics
Now consider the quotient surface M=Γ\H.  The following description refers to the upper half-plane model of the hyperbolic plane.  This is a hyperbolic surface, in fact, a Riemann surface. Each hyperbolic element h of Γ determines a closed geodesic of Γ\H: first, by connecting the geodesic semicircle joining the fixed points of h, we get a geodesic on H called the axis of h, and by projecting this geodesic to M, we get a geodesic on Γ\H.

This geodesic is closed because 2 points which are in the same orbit under the action of Γ project to the same point on the quotient, by definition.

It can be shown that this gives a 1-1 correspondence between closed geodesics on Γ\H and hyperbolic conjugacy classes in Γ. The prime geodesics are then those geodesics that trace out their image exactly once — algebraically, they correspond to primitive hyperbolic conjugacy classes, that is, conjugacy classes {γ} such that γ cannot be written as a nontrivial power of another element of Γ.

Applications of prime geodesics
The importance of prime geodesics comes from their relationship to other branches of mathematics, especially dynamical systems, ergodic theory, and number theory, as well as Riemann surfaces themselves. These applications often overlap among several different research fields.

Dynamical systems and ergodic theory
In dynamical systems, the closed geodesics represent the periodic orbits of the geodesic flow.

Number theory
In number theory, various "prime geodesic theorems" have been proved which are very similar in spirit to the prime number theorem. To be specific, we let π(x) denote the number of closed geodesics whose norm (a function related to length) is less than or equal to x; then π(x) ∼ x/ln(x). This result is usually credited to Atle Selberg. In his 1970 Ph.D. thesis, Grigory Margulis proved a similar result for surfaces of variable negative curvature, while in his 1980 Ph.D. thesis, Peter Sarnak proved an analogue of Chebotarev's density theorem.

There are other similarities to number theory — error estimates are improved upon, in much the same way that error estimates of the prime number theorem are improved upon. Also, there is a Selberg zeta function which is formally similar to the usual Riemann zeta function and shares many of its properties.

Algebraically, prime geodesics can be lifted to higher surfaces in much the same way that prime ideals in the ring of integers of a number field can be split (factored) in a Galois extension. See Covering map and Splitting of prime ideals in Galois extensions for more details.

Riemann surface theory
Closed geodesics have been used to study Riemann surfaces; indeed, one of Riemann's original definitions of the genus of a surface was in terms of simple closed curves. Closed geodesics have been instrumental in studying the eigenvalues of Laplacian operators, arithmetic Fuchsian groups, and Teichmüller spaces.

See also
Fuchsian group
Modular group Gamma
Riemann surface
Fuchsian model
Analytic number theory
Zoll surface

Riemann surfaces
Differential geometry
Dynamical systems
Number theory
Geodesic (mathematics)
Hyperbolic geometry